Nicetas the Confessor may refer to: 

 Nicetas of Medikion (died 824), iconophile monk and abbot
 Saint Nicetas the Patrician (died 836), iconophile monk and abbot